The Cabo de Gata-Níjar National Park is a natural park located in the province of Almería, Spain. It is the largest protected coastal area in Andalusia, featuring a wild and isolated landscape. Spain's southeastern coast, where the park is situated, is the only region in mainland Europe with a hot desert climate (Köppen climate classification: BWh).

The eponymous mountain range of the Sierra del Cabo de Gata, with its highest peak El Fraile, form a volcanic rock formation with sharp peaks and crags with red and ochre colouration.

Offshore are numerous tiny rocky islands and extensive coral reefs teeming with marine life. Its climate is dry, with rainfall below  a year and average yearly temperatures above . In 1997, it was designated as a UNESCO Biosphere Reserve. In 2001, it was included among the Specially Protected Areas of Mediterranean Importance. Due to the adsorptive properties and low permeability of its clays, the area was studied as a possible place for deep storage of sealed radioactive waste.

Geology, geography, climate, and vegetation 

Cabo de Gata-Níjar Natural Park is characterised by volcanic rock formations as well as lava flows, volcanic domes, and volcanic calderas. The park joined UNESCO's Global Geoparks Network in 2006, and it is also a member of the European Geoparks Network.

Between the village of San Miguel and the Cabo de Gata point are salt flats (Las Salinas de Cabo de Gata) separated from the sea by a  sand bar. The salt flats are a Ramsar site.

Its coasts have seagrass beds of the genus Posidonia and offshore coral reefs, both contributing to increase the numbers of resident and transient marine species.

The area has a hot desert climate (Köppen climate classification: BWh) with rather mild temperatures year round for the heavy maritime influence.

The characteristic vegetation in the terrestrial zone is a drought-adapted flora: large agave, prickly pear, dwarf fan palms, and a number of xerophytes (some of which are endemic). There is Posidonia seagrass in the marine zone.

Human impact on the park

Historically, due to the harsh conditions for agriculture and its isolated location, habitation has been sparse and this has kept the area relatively unspoilt, an unusual feature along the Spanish Mediterranean coast. In 1997, 3,500 people were recorded as living within the boundaries. The natural park protection has now received promises to keep the residential expansion under control. Dotted around the natural park are abandoned farms, houses, factories, and sometimes, whole villages dating back to various periods in time. The exact reasons for the abandonment are not clear, but it is thought that the harsh conditions for agriculture together with questionable permissions to build and the prevailing economic climate at the time, would be major factors. Sadly, this is something that continues to this day with perhaps the most infamous example being the Algarrobico.

In 2003, a hotel project was started at Playa del Algarrobico between Carboneras and Mojacar, just inside the park. Work on the project was halted, but demolition, which is opposed by 14 municipalities, has yet to be carried out. Several reputable sources claim with good evidence, that this project is an illegal development although it seems that more recently demolition plans are moving closer.  In 2021, the highest regional court of Andalusia ruled that the hotel did not have to be destroyed because the real estate developer had a valid building license.

There are also a number of abandoned villages and buildings that are considered to be of historical importance and so remain as they have been left. Good examples of this are the deserted mining villages around Rodalquilar. Although the villages or "ghost towns" and the former gold mines are a blot on the landscape, they are a big attraction.

Sadly there are also a number of national treasures that lie in ruins, and an example of this is Cortijo del Fraile. Every now and then there is a move to restore it, but as yet, nothing has happened except a few efforts to raise money.

Tourism
Tourism is one of the biggest industries in the Parque Natural de Cabo de Gata with a huge number of visitors coming mainly during the spring and summer months. In 1998, there were 500,000 tourists visiting the area and although the number of visitors has declined in the past years (2011/2012) due to economic conditions across Europe, tourism still remains strong.

Over recent years there has been a trend toward sustainable / eco tourism and visitors can enjoy environmentally-friendly outdoor activities such as bird watching, photography experiences, geological field-trips, as well as the more established diving and boat excursions. There are a number of arts and crafts based on local traditions that are still carried out around the Parque Natural de Cabo de Gata and especially so in the little Moorish "pueblo blanco" of Níjar. The traditional arts and crafts include ceramics, pottery, carpet making and woven goods (baskets, hats, shoes, etc.) made from esparto grass. The same arts and crafts are found in many different places around the natural park alongside painting, sculpture, and photography. Also one may find in several of the pueblos, craft market stalls selling hand-made (hecho de mano) jewellery, leather goods, and clothing, in addition to local shops selling local produce such as olive oil, wine, almonds, tomatoes, and so on.

There also has been an increase in the number of health retreats that offer holistic therapies, meditation, and yoga.

While the hiking network is not extensive, there are a number of senderos that provide for some good day hikes. The Caldera de Majada Redonda is one such trail that leads to the center of an ancient volcano caldera.

Towns 
There are some small towns in the Cabo de Gata area.

Agua Amarga
Translated from the Spanish, Agua Amarga literally means "bitter water". This name dates back to when trains used to bring minerals from the mines in the Sierra Alhamilla and chemicals used in the mining process would taint the wells in the town. These days Agua Amarga is one of the hot-spots for visitors to the Parque Natural de Cabo de Gata. It is a seaside town.

This small village is surrounded by many small beaches with crystalline water and  submarine life, adapted for snorkeling.

Cabo de Gata
The strip of beach known as Playa de San Miguel and the adjacent road stretches from the small village of Cabo de Gata to La Fabriquilla before ascending a tiny mountain pass toward the Arrecife de las Sirenas and the stunning beaches beyond. This coastal strip is generally known as Cabo de Gata although it comprises several little smaller villages (pueblitos) including Cabo de Gata, Almadraba de Monteleva, and La Fabriquila. At Almadraba de Monteleva are the salt works that are still operational, next to the salt works are the ram shackled and salt-blasted houses of former workers, some of which are still occupied. Opposite these houses is the church of San Miguel. Behind the salt-works are the lagoons known as Las Salinas de Cabo de Gata, as previously mentioned. Cabo de Gata has tradition of fishing, which continues to this day, and there are a number of old fishing boats that have been left along the Playa de San Miguel as artifacts of days gone by. These are said to have an important ethnological value and so are left as a "living museum".

Carboneras
The pueblo of Carboneras is located near to the easternmost border of Parque Natural de Cabo de Gata and is a fairly large town.

Located just a little out-of-town and en route to Agua Amarga, is the naturist beach of Playa de los Muertos (the Beach of the Dead), which is reported to have been voted one of the country's top beaches. Carboneras is also known as a town of live music due to the Teatro de Musica and a number of other smaller venues hosting live music all year round. At its western edge it has an industrial area that combines a power station, a large cement plant, one of Europe's largest desalination (reverse-osmosis) plants and a port, all of which pre-date the setting up the national park. The power station has been used for carbon capture research. Whilst the desalination plant, provides water to the local communities, as well as the burgeoning green house based vegetable industry.

Las Negras
Las Negras is a little different from the other pueblos in Parque Natural de Cabo de Gata. It is a little sea-side village towards the eastern end of the natural park and just to the west of Agua Amarga. Las Negras has some rather odd buildings that are very 1970s in appearance because it has been developed in a more modern style to other towns. From Las Negras there is a footpath to Cala de San Pedro, which takes about 40 minutes to an hour to walk; alternatively, one may take a boat.

Los Albaricoques
Movie buffs may recognise Los Albaricoques as being the pueblo of Agua Caliente in the seminal films of Sergio Leone. The final shootout in the spaghetti Western film For a Few Dollars More took place in the centre of Los Albaricoques. The economy of Los Albaricoques relies heavily on the agriculture that surrounds the village; arguably, some of the best tomatoes from Spain are grown in this area, notably the 'Raff'. There is only one shop and two bars in Los Albaricoques. One of these bars, Hostal Alba, is a mecca for film buffs and a tribute to the village's cinematic history. Not far from the pueblo of Los Albaricoques is the infamous Cortijo del Fraile, the backdrop for Federico Garcia Lorca's seminal play, Bodas de Sangre (Blood Wedding), which features a crime of passion that took place close by.

Níjar
Níjar is located inland and on the northern edge of the natural park. Níjar hosts processions on Semana Santa (Holy Week). In the bigger towns and cities around Spain, these processions are quite lavish including at times some very intricate animatronics but in smaller towns, such as in Níjar, they are much more "earthy" affairs.

Rodalquilar
The pueblo of Rodalquilar sits in the middle of the Parque Natural de Cabo de Gata and is a haven for the local artistic community. There are several galleries showing off painting, photography, pottery, and ceramics. Rodalaquilar is a sleepy town with some nice places to eat and stunning beaches and could not be more different from its past, for it is known in the province of Almería for ancient mines of gold. A trip to the natural park is not complete without a visit to the goldmines and abandoned miner villages. One of the more popular "must see" beaches near Rodalquilar is Playa el Playazo. This beach is 400 meters long and 30 meters wide, and its sand is golden and fine. 
In common with many of the beaches in the middle and toward the western end of the natural park, the sea offers a good visibility for snorkelling or diving.. El Playazo is encircled by a mountain as well as by the Saint Ramon's Castle. This Castle was built in the 18th century so that the coast of Almería could defend itself from sea attacks.

Rodalquilar was the townsite for the Rodalquilar Gold Mine, which operated intermittently from Roman times to the mid 1960s. The new mineral Rodalquilarite was discovered there.  The abandoned mine workings were used for a post-apocalyptic film set

San José
San José is a small fishing port in the centre of the natural park and is accessible from Almería Airport and the Autovia A-7. San José is most popular during the spring and summer months. This is because of the activities that the beaches of San José can offer such as snorkel or swimming. The local tourist office offers a reference point for activities in the Parque Natural de Cabo de Gata.

Various other
There are a number of smaller towns and villages in the Parque Natural de Cabo de Gata that are worth mentioning and each with its own charm and historical or ethnological importance. Campohermoso, Fernán Pérez, Isleta del Moro, Los Escullos, Pozo de los Frailes, and San Isidro are just some of them. Isleta del Moro and Los Escullos are particularly interesting as they are along the coast and have some stunning, if not smaller beaches. There is a network of footpaths (senderos) that connect all the seaside towns and pueblos.

Flora

There are more than 1,000 plants recorded in the reserve, some of which are endemic to the Parque Natural de Cabo de Gata and some of which have become symbols of the natural park. The Natural Park of Cabo de Gata presents special weather conditions, which permit the plants taking advantages of the rain. These plants are very diverse, surviving the weather and adapting to the characteristics of the ground.

European fan palm
The European fan palm (Chamaerops humilis) is a shrub-like clumping palm, with several stems growing from a single base. It is the only palm species native to continental Europe and is mainly found in southwestern Europe (Spain, Portugal, Italy, Malta and certain locations on the Mediterranean coast of France) and northwest Africa (Morocco, Algeria, Tunisia). Europe's only native palm, supplements the meagre groundwater supplies with dew and airborne moisture.

Agave americana (Pita)
One of the most familiar plant species in the natural park is Agave (Pita) Americana, a native of tropical America and Mexico. Common names include century plant, maguey (in Mexico), or American aloe (it is not, however, closely related to the genus Aloe). The name "century plant" refers to the long time the plant takes to flower. The number of years before flowering occurs depends on the vigor of the individual plant, the richness of the soil, and the climate; during these years the plant is storing in its fleshy leaves the nutrients required for the effort of flowering.

Dragoncillo del Cabo
Some of the plants endemic to the Parque Natural de Cabo de Gata include the pink snapdragon (Antirrhinum charidemi), known to the locals as the Dragoncillo del Cabo. This endemic plant is called as the Dragoncillo del Cabo because its flower are pink with dark veins. It grows in rock cracks, rocky slopes and volcanic slopes near the sea.

Other plants
Iberia's largest population of jujube (Ziziphus zizyphus), a thorny shrub, populates the steppe and is known locally as Azofeifa. The scrubland is composed of olive trees (Olea europaea), mastic (Pistacia lentiscus), Kermes oaks (Quercus coccifera), esparto grass (Stipa tenacissima), thyme (Thymus) and rosemary (Rosmarinus officinalis).

Around the salt flats are colonies of saltworts, common reeds (Phragmites australis) and the glasswort (Salicornia fruticosa). In the coastal waters are extensive beds of seagrass (Posidonia oceanica), which is endemic to the Mediterranean, and 260 species of seaweed.

Fauna

1,100 species of fauna have been recorded within the park, the majority of which are birds. The European Union has designated a Special Protection Area for bird-life. The salt flats provide an important habitat for both the resident birds and the thousands of migrating birds who stop on their journey between Europe and Africa. Species found around the salt flats include flamingos (Phoenicopterus roseus); grey (Ardea cinerea); purple herons (Ardea purpurea); storks; cranes; waders including avocets and oystercatchers; and overwintering ducks.

Many species of lark live on the steppe, including the rare Dupont's lark (Chersophilus duponti) and there are also little bustards (Tetrax tetrax) and stone curlews (Burhinus oedicnemus). Sea birds include yellow-legged gulls (Larus michahellis), terns, razorbills (Alca torda), shags, the occasional puffin (Fratercula arctica) and Cory's (Calonectris diomedea) and Balearic shearwaters (Puffinus mauretanicus). The wealth of animal life provides prey for a number of raptors: ospreys (Pandion haliaetus), peregrine falcons (Falco peregrinus), kestrels (Falco tinnunculus), and eagles.

Approximately 15 species of reptile are found in the park, including Italian wall lizards (Podarcis sicula), ocellated lizards (Timon lepidus), grass snakes (Natrix natrix), and Lataste's viper (Vipera latastei).

The maritime reserve is home to various species of crustaceans, molluscs, and fishes including the common cuttlefish (Sepia officinalis), the Pinna nobilis clam that produces sea silk, the Mediterranean moray (Muraena helena) that was regarded as a delicacy by the Romans, the garfish (Belone belone), and flying gurnard (Dactylopterus volitans), which uses its enlarged pectoral fins to "walk" along the ocean floor. Seaweeds host fish such as bream and grouper.

Among the mammals in the park are common genets (Genetta genetta), wild boar (Sus scrofa), the garden dormouse (Eliomys quercinus), and the least weasel (Mustela nivalis), the smallest terrestrial mammalian carnivore. The seagrass used to provide a habitat for the endangered monk seal (Monachus monachus). Up until the 1960s it was one of the last locations where this seal bred in Spain, the islet of Tabarca being the other one. Although occasionally sighted offshore, no seals have bred in the park since 1965.

Media
Notable movies were filmed in the natural park, at the Playa de Mónsul, such as Antony and Cleopatra (1972), The NeverEnding Story (1984), The Adventures of Baron Munchausen (1988), Indiana Jones and the Last Crusade (1989) and Talk to Her (2002).

British band Jamiroquai filmed the video for their 1996 single "Cosmic Girl" in the natural park.

See also
European Geoparks Network
Global Geoparks Network

Notes

External links 

 
Geography of the Province of Almería
Deserts of Spain
Deserts of Europe
Global Geoparks Network members
Marine reserves of Spain
Natural parks of Spain
Natural parks of Andalusia
Ramsar sites in Spain
Special Protection Areas of Spain
Protected areas established in 1997
Geoparks in Spain
Volcanoes of Spain
Miocene volcanoes